Couch Baby is the debut album by Jamie Isaac. It was released on July 8, 2016.

Track listing

References

2016 debut albums
Jamie Isaac albums
Marathon Artists albums